The Església de Sant Tomàs de Fluvià is an 11th Century monastic church in Torroella de Fluvià, named after the river Fluvià.

References

Churches in Catalonia